Shin may refer to:

Biology
 The front part of the human leg below the knee
 Shinbone, the tibia, the larger of the two bones in the leg below the knee in vertebrates

Names
 Shin (given name) (Katakana: シン, Hiragana: しん), a Japanese given name
 Shin (Korean surname) (Hangul: 신, Hanja: 申, 辛, 愼), a Korean family name
 Shin (Chinese: 新, which means "new"), spelled in Pinyin as Xin

Fictional characters
Shin Akuma, a character in the Street Fighter series 
Shin Asuka (disambiguation), multiple
 Shin Malphur, a character in the video game Destiny 2: Forsaken
Kamen Rider Shin, a character in the Kamen Rider series
Seijuro Shin (進), a character in the manga and anime series Eyeshield 21
 A character in the manga Dorohedoro
 A character in the manga and anime Fist of the North Star

Music
 Shin (band)
 Shin (singer) (蘇見信), a Taiwanese singer and former lead singer of the band Shin
 Shin, the drummer of the German visual kei group Cinema Bizarre
 The Shin, a Georgian fusion jazz band 
 The Shins, an American indie band
 Shin (シン), a Japanese rock singer and former vocalist of Vivid

Places
 Shin, Iran, a village in Zanjan Province, Iran
 Shin, Swat, an administrative unit in the Khyber Pakhtunkhwa province of Pakistan
 Shin, Syria, a village in Syria
 Loch Shin, a loch in the Scottish Highlands
 River Shin, a river in the Scottish Highlands

Other uses
 Shin (letter), the twenty-first letter in many Semitic alphabets, including Hebrew  and Arabic 
 Shin Buddhism, a widely practiced branch of Buddhism in Japan, named after its founder, Shinran
 Shin Corporation, one of the largest conglomerates in Thailand
 Shina language
 Shina people, an ethnic group who live in parts of Pakistan and northern India
 Shin (信), a principle of Nichiren Buddhism

See also
 
 
 Şin, Azerbaijan
 Shina (disambiguation)
 Shine (disambiguation)
 Shien (disambiguation)
 Shein (disambiguation)
 Sheen (disambiguation)
 Chin (disambiguation)